C/2012 K1 (PanSTARRS) is a retrograde Oort cloud comet discovered at magnitude 19.7, 8.7 AU from the Sun on 17 May 2012 using the Pan-STARRS telescope located near the summit of Haleakalā, on the island of Maui in Hawaii (U.S.).

The comet started 2014 as a Northern Hemisphere object. By late April 2014 it had brightened to roughly apparent magnitude ~8.8 making it a small telescope/binoculars target for experienced observers. In June and July 2014 the comet was near the Sickle of Leo. As of 3 July 2014 the comet had brightened to magnitude 7.9.

From 12 July 2014 until 6 September 2014 it had an elongation less than 30 degrees from the Sun. It crosses the celestial equator on 15 September 2014 becoming a Southern Hemisphere object.

The comet peaked around magnitude 6.9 in mid-October 2014 when it had an elongation of around 75 degrees from the Sun. It is visible in binoculars and small telescopes.

References

External links 
Get Set For Comet K1 PanSTARRS: A Guide to its Spring Appearance (Universe Today 17 March 2014)
Comet Pan-STARRS Marches Across the Sky (3 July 2014)
C/2012 K1 in the constellation Puppis. Captured 10-23-2014

20120517
20130615
20140827
Oort cloud
Discoveries by Pan-STARRS